The 2017 Men's League1 Ontario season was the fourth season of play for League1 Ontario, a Division 3 semi-professional soccer league in the Canadian soccer pyramid and the highest level of soccer based in the Canadian province of Ontario.

For the first time, the league expanded to include teams in the nation's capital, Ottawa, allowing it to span from the western to eastern borders of southern Ontario.

Changes from 2016 
The men's division remained at 16 teams for this season, with the addition of Ottawa South United and the departure of the Kingston Clippers.

Toronto FC Academy renamed itself to Toronto FC III, as its parent club (Toronto FC) withdrew their squad from the Premier Development League.  Aurora United FC was also renamed to Aurora FC.

Starting this year, the league champion was granted a place in the next year's Canadian Championship.  As a result, the Inter-Provincial Cup was discontinued.

Teams

Standings 
Each team will play 22 matches as part of the season; two against every team in their own conference, and one against every team in the opposing conference.  The top team from each conference will meet at the end of the season to determine the league champion. The champion will enter the 2018 Canadian Championship.

Eastern Conference

Western Conference

League Championship 
The league champion is determined by a single-match series between the top-ranked teams from the western and eastern conferences. The winner qualifies for the 2018 Canadian Championship.

Cup 
The cup tournament is a separate contest from the rest of the season, in which all sixteen teams from the men's division take part.  It is not a form of playoffs at the end of the season (as is typically seen in North American sports), but is more like the Canadian Championship or the FA Cup, albeit only for League1 Ontario teams.  All matches are separate from the regular season, and are not reflected in the season standings.

The cup tournament for the men's division is a single-match knockout tournament with four total rounds culminating in a final match in the start of August, with initial matchups determined by random draw.  Each match in the tournament must return a result; any match drawn after 90 minutes will advance directly to kicks from the penalty mark instead of extra time.

First Round

Quarterfinals

Semifinals

Final

Statistics

Top scorers 

Updated to matches played on October 8, 2017.  Source:

Top goalkeepers 

Updated to matches played on October 8, 2017.  Minimum 540 minutes played.  Source:

Awards 
The following players received honours in the 2017 season:

 First Team All-Stars

 Second Team All-Stars

 Third Team All-Stars

All-Star Game 
On June 28, the league announced that this year's all-star game would take place against an all-star team from the Première Ligue de soccer du Québec.  The roster for this game was selected by team & league officials, and was announced on July 18.

References

External links 

League1
League1 Ontario seasons